Henriette Mendel, Baroness von Wallersee (July 31, 1833 – November 12, 1891) was a German actress, and the mistress and, later, morganatic wife of Ludwig Wilhelm, Duke in Bavaria. By him she was the mother of Countess Marie Larisch von Moennich.

Biography
Born Auguste Henriette Mendel in Darmstadt, Hessen-Darmstadt, she was the daughter of Adam Mendel and of Anna Sophie Müller. In English she is usually known as Henrietta Mendel. The family was reportedly Jewish, but since centuries Protestants.

She was an actress at Darmstadt's Großherzoglich Hessisches Hoftheater when she and Ludwig Wilhelm, Duke in Bavaria fell in love. As a Duke in Bavaria (Herzog in Bayern), Ludwig was a high-ranking member of Bavaria's Royal House of Wittelsbach. He was a cousin of Maximilian II of Bavaria (and thus a great-cousin of the future "Mad King" Ludwig II of Bavaria). He was the brother-in-law of Emperor Franz Joseph I of Austria, to whom his younger sister Elisabeth (Sissi) was married.

Henriette and Ludwig had an illegitimate daughter, Marie Louise, born on February 24, 1858. Marie would later become famous under her married name, Countess Marie Larisch von Moennich.

When Henriette became pregnant a second time, a morganatic marriage was arranged. Ludwig renounced succession rights to the Bavarian throne on March 9, 1859. The couple's son Karl Emanuel was born on May 9, 1859, Henriette was created Freifrau von Wallersee on May 19, 1859, and the marriage occurred on May 28, 1859 in Augsburg, Bavaria, at which time her children became Freiin and Freiherr von Wallersee. For the marriage she had to convert to Catholicism.

Karl Emanuel only survived a few months, dying on August 1, 1859. The couple had no more children.

The baroness died November 12, 1891 in Munich, Bavaria of uterine cancer. One year later, her widower, Duke Ludwig, married Barbara Antonie Barth, who had been created Baroness von Bartolf, on November 19, 1892.

Further reading
 Countess Marie Larisch, My Past, G. P. Putnam's Sons, New York & London, 1913. Ghostwritten by Maude Mary Chester ffoulkes
 Brigitte Sokop, Jene Gräfin Larisch, Böhlau, Wien 1985, 4. ed., 2006,

References

1833 births
1891 deaths
German baronesses
19th-century German actresses
German stage actresses
Actors from Darmstadt
People from the Grand Duchy of Hesse
Deaths from stomach cancer
German courtesans
Deaths from cancer in Germany
Morganatic spouses of German royalty